Institutiones calculi differentialis (Foundations of differential calculus) is a mathematical work written in 1748 by Leonhard Euler and published in 1755 that lays the groundwork for the differential calculus. It consists of a single volume containing two internal books; there are 9 chapters in book I, and 18 in book II.

 writes that "this is the first textbook on the differential calculus which has any claim to be both complete and accurate, and it may be said that all modern treatises on the subject are based on it."

See also 
 Institutiones calculi integralis
List of important publications in mathematics

References

External links
 Full text in Latin available from e-rara.ch.
 German translation Vollständige Anleitung zur Differenzial-Rechnung available from e-rara.ch.

Mathematics literature
Differential calculus
1755 books
Leonhard Euler
18th-century Latin books